A parlor car (or parlour car outside the United States of America) is a type of passenger coach that provides superior comforts and amenities compared to a standard coach.

History 

Parlor cars came about on United States railroads to address the absence of separate class accommodations. In the United Kingdom and Europe, passenger trains carried first-, second- and third-class coaches, with the first-class coaches offering the best seating and costing the most. In contrast, American trains offered a flat rate and standard accommodations. For 19th-century writers this represented a difference between class-bound Europe and the democratic United States.

Parlor accommodations were appreciated by those who used them because of their exclusivity. H. L. Mencken called the parlor car "the best investment open to an American":

Most parlor cars were found on daytime trains in the Northeast United States. In comparison to a standard coach, parlor cars offered more comfortable seating and surroundings, as well as food and beverages, but were far inferior to sleeping cars for overnight trips.

Today

United States 

Elevated service survives on Amtrak although the term "parlor car" has fallen into disuse. One recently discontinued example was the Pacific Parlour Car on the Coast Starlight, converted Hi-Level lounges which featured a mixture of 1x1 swivel-chair seating and cafe-style seating. In contrast to past usage, this car was provided as a sleeping car passenger-only lounge and was not itself bookable. Amtrak discontinued the Pacific Parlour in February 2018. The Acela offers First Class service, including at-seat service and improved seating. Other Amtrak trains offer a Business Class, which includes roomier seating and, on some routes, a complimentary beverage and newspaper.

Notes

References 

Passenger railroad cars